The Kamendin railway station is a railway stop that serves the Zemun Polje and Kamendin neighborhoods of Zemun, Serbia.

Along with the nearby  train stop, the Kamendin stop was constructed as part of the Belgrade–Novi Sad railway reconstruction of 2019–2022. It is served by BG Voz urban rail trains.

Layout 

The stop has two side platforms, each 110 meters long, serving two tracks. The platforms are connected by an underground passageway.

Services and access 

The stop is equipped with elevators, and features an automated public address system. Bicycle parking is marked by the hand railings.

Nearby are bus stops served by city bus lines 704, 707 and 709.

Gallery

See also 
BG Voz

References 

Railway stations in Belgrade
Zemun